Cuba is an unincorporated community in Early County, in the U.S. state of Georgia. It is just two or three miles south of Blakely, Georgia.

History
A post office called Cuba was established in 1883, and remained in operation until 1890. The community takes its name from the island of Cuba.

References

Unincorporated communities in Early County, Georgia
Unincorporated communities in Georgia (U.S. state)